"Identity" is a song by American metalcore band August Burns Red. Released on May 26, 2015, it is the second single from their seventh studio album Found in Far Away Places. The song was nominated for Best Metal Performance for the 2016 Grammy Awards, losing to Cirice by Ghost. The lyrics were based on the coming out of a friend.

Charts

References

2015 songs
2015 singles
August Burns Red songs
Fearless Records singles